Management fad is a term used to characterize a change in philosophy or operations implemented by a business or institution. It amounts to a fad in the management culture of an institution. 

The term is subjective and tends to be used in a pejorative sense, as it implies that such a change is being implemented (often by management on its employees, with little or no input from them) solely because it is (at the time) "popular" within managerial circles, and not necessarily due to any real need for organizational change. The term further implies that once the underlying philosophy is no longer "popular", it will be replaced by the newest "popular" idea, in the same manner and for the same reason as the previous idea.

Alternatively, the pejorative use of the term expresses a cynical belief that the organization desires change that would be resisted by the rank and file if presented directly, so it is dressed up in a dramatic change of management style, to remain in place only as long as it serves the underlying agenda. 

Several authors have argued that new management ideas should be subject to greater critical analysis, and for the need for greater conceptual awareness of new ideas by managers.  Authors Leonard J. Ponzi and Michael Koenig believe that a key determinant of whether any management idea is a "management fad" is the number and timing of published articles on the idea.  In their research, Ponzi and Koenig argue that once an idea has been discussed for around 3–5 years, if after this time the number of articles on the idea in a given year decreases significantly (similar to the right-hand side of a bell curve), then the idea is most likely a "management fad".

Common characteristics

Management fads are often characterized by the following:
New jargon for existing business processes.
External consultants who specialize in the implementation of the fad.
A certification or appraisal process performed by an external agency for a fee.
Amending the job titles of existing employees to include references to the fad.
Claims of a measurable business improvement via measurement of a metric (e.g. key performance indicator) that is defined by the fad itself.
An internal sponsoring department or individual that gains influence due to the fad's implementation.
Big words and complex phrases (puffery).

Origins 
Consultants and even academics have developed new management ideas. Journalists may popularize new concepts.

Like other fashions, trends in management thought may grow, decline, and recur. Judy Wajcman sees the human relations movement of the 1930s as a precursor of the later fashion of  "transformational management".

Examples
The following  management theories and practices appeared on a 2004 list of management fashions and fads compiled by Adrian Furnham, who arranged them in rough chronological order by their date of appearance, 1950s to 1990s:

Management by objectives
Matrix management
Theory Z
 One-minute management
Management by wandering around
Total quality management
Business process reengineering
Delayering
Empowerment
360-degree feedback
 Re-engineering
Teamwork

Other theories and practices which observers have tagged as fads include:

 ISO 9000
 Six Sigma
 the tendency to replace every occurrence of "data" in compound managerial terminology with "information", see e.g. information integration vs. data integration
 Knowledge management
 Design thinking
 DevOps
 Lean six sigma
 Transformational leadership
 5S
 Agile software development
 Enterprise architecture frameworks
 "thriving on chaos"
 Open-plan offices 
 Stack ranking, where employees are encouraged to rat each other out in order to secure their own advancement and budget
 Consensus management
 Best practice
 The Tao of Leadership

See also
Philosophy of business
Organizational performance
Management consulting: Criticism section
Dilbert
Hype cycle
Business fable

References

Further reading 
 Crainer, Stuart and Des Dearlove, “Whatever Happened to Yesterday's Bright Ideas?,” Across the Board, Vol. 43, No. 3, May/June 2006, pp. 34–40.
 Malone, Michael S., “A Way Too Short History of Fads,” Forbes, Vol. 159, No. 7, April 7, 1997 (ASAP supplement).
 Paul, Annie Murphy, “I Feel Your Pain,” Forbes, Vol. 174, No. 13, Dec. 27, 2004, p. 38.
 Strang, David and Michael W. Macy, "In Search of Excellence: Fads, Success Stories, and Adaptive Emulation," American Journal of Sociology, July 2001, Vol. 107, No. 1, pp. 147–182.
 
 

For a critique of the practice of branding new management ideas as fads, see

 Collins, David, "The Branding of Management Knowledge: Rethinking Management 'Fads’," Journal of Organizational Change Management, 2003, Vol. 16, No. 2, pp. 186-204.
 Collins, David, "The Fad Motif in Management Scholarship," Employee Relations, Vol. 23, No. 1, Feb. 2001, pp. 26–37.

For a listicle see:
 The 8 Stupidest Management Fads of All Time, CBS Money

History of business
Business terms